A Market-based valuation is a form of stock valuation that refers to market indicators, also called extrinsic criteria (i.e. not related to economic fundamentals and account data, which are intrinsic criteria).

Examples of market valuation methods

Technical analysis
Technical analysis is the most characteristic market-based method, although it focuses more on timing than pricing.

Also, rough market comparison tools such as the PE ratio and the PEG ratio are used. More sophisticated forms of analysis (fundamental analysis, quantitative analysis, and behavioral analysis) use also some market criteria, such as the risk premium or beta coefficient.

Those criteria might be "tilted" in some valuation models in anticipation of their possible variation in the next future, or to adapt them to their historical statistical range or mean.

See also
List of valuation topics
Price discovery
Valuation using multiples
Valuation using discounted cash flows
Valuation using the Market Penetration Model

External links
stock image and behavioral finance

Stock market